Ihsan Nabil Farhan Haddad is a Jordanian footballer who plays for Iraqi club Al-Shorta and the Jordan national football team.

International goals

With U-16

With U-23

None-International goals

International goals
Scores and results list Jordan's goal tally first.

References

External links
 Koora.com
 

Living people
Jordanian footballers
Jordan international footballers
Jordan youth international footballers
Association football midfielders
1994 births
Footballers at the 2014 Asian Games
Al-Faisaly SC players
Al-Wehdat SC players
Al-Ramtha SC players
Al-Hussein SC (Irbid) players
Al-Arabi (Jordan) players
Al-Quwa Al-Jawiya players
Al-Shorta SC players
Jordanian Pro League players
Iraqi Premier League players
Jordanian expatriate footballers
Jordanian expatriate sportspeople in Iraq
Expatriate footballers in Iraq
2019 AFC Asian Cup players
Asian Games competitors for Jordan